The Turkish State Railways (TCDD) started building high-speed rail lines in 2003. TCDD has branded its high-speed service as Yüksek Hızlı Tren (YHT) which currently operates on two lines: the Ankara–Istanbul high-speed railway and the Ankara–Konya high-speed railway.

On 13 March 2009, the first phase of the Ankara–Istanbul high-speed railway entered service between Ankara and Eskişehir. On 25 July 2014, the Ankara-Istanbul high-speed railway services began to reach the Pendik railway station on the Asian side of Istanbul, and on 13 March 2019 the services began to reach the Halkalı railway station on the European side of Istanbul, passing through the Marmaray railway tunnel under the Bosphorus strait. There were initially 6 daily departures in both directions.

On 23 August 2011, the YHT service on the Ankara–Konya high-speed railway was inaugurated.

High-speed rail in Turkey is still developing, with new lines currently under construction or in the planning phase.

Lines in operation

Ankara–İstanbul high-speed line

The whole line was electrified, but low radius turns and poor track quality made high-speed rail transport impossible. Prior to the upgrading of this line in 2006, the railway's market share of Istanbul–Ankara passenger transit was 10%, with a travel time of ~6.5 hours.

The Ankara–Istanbul HST line opened on 25 July 2014, with all trains terminating at Pendik, which is 1 hour by bus from Kadikoy in the eastern suburbs of Istanbul. There are 12 trips per day and the journey takes 3.5 hours. All trains stop at Eskişehir and İzmit.

Design and construction
The high-speed railway connects the county's largest metropolises, Ankara the capital and conurbation of İstanbul via Eskişehir, with a junction at Polatlı to the Ankara-Konya high-speed line. 

The railway link was built by a Chinese-Turkish consortium, which was formed when the China Railway Construction Corporation and the China National Machinery Import and Export Corporation won the bid in 2005 to build the railway line in partnership with two Turkish companies, Cengiz Construction and Ibrahim Cecen Ictas Construction.

The first part of the line to be constructed (Phase 1) was the Ankara–Eskişehir section, specifically between Sincan and İnönü, scheduled to open in 2006.

The second phase was scheduled to open in 2008 and included more difficult terrain which covers the path between İnönü and Köseköy, extending to Gebze close to Istanbul. The service in this line is expected to start on 25 July 2014. A part of the route has not been completed yet by the time of opening, so conventional line will be used until the completion of the project.

Operation and rolling stock

The Ankara to Eskişehir section officially opened on 13 March 2009.

The line is operated by the Turkish State Railways, using the TCDD HT65000 six-car train sets constructed by the Construcciones y Auxiliar de Ferrocarriles (CAF) of Spain.

On 13 November 2009, a high-speed train derailed near Eskişehir.

On 25 July 2014, Istanbul–Ankara high-speed train service started. The stretch has not completed yet, thus service is partially using conventional line, which causes a little longer trip than the target. 8 trains depart every day in both directions. Final station in İstanbul is temporarily Pendik, a district in east of İstanbul. Several public-transport connections are organized to access the HST trains.

In addition to 11 sets of CAF used in Ankara–Eskişehir and Ankara–Konya routes, TCDD had bought seven Siemens Velaro sets for the Ankara–İstanbul line, open by the end of 2013.

TCDD had also opened a new tender for 106 new sets to be supplied in 5 years and used in new-added lines. This tender was cancelled and redone in 2018.

Ankara–Konya high-speed line

The second high-speed line construction project in Turkey was a line from Polatlı on the Ankara to İstanbul line to Konya.

ETCS Level 2 will be used.

Construction was split into two phases: Phase 1 was the  section and Phase 2 was the  section between Polatlı and Konya.

The line includes a tunnel of 2030m. The first test train ran in December 2010; Revenue services began on 24 August 2011. Currently, same CAF trains which are used on Ankara–Eskisehir line are running on this line with 250 km/h maximum speed. In the future, TCDD will procure 6 more sets with up to 350 km/h.
The journey time between the two cities (Ankara–Konya) is 1 and a half hours, dropping to 1 hour and 15 minutes in the future. Previously the journey time was 10 hours and 30 minutes. There are 10 trains a day, though this will rise to one per hour in the future.

Konya-Karaman high-speed line

This 102 km high-speed line opened on 8 January 2022. The Konya-Karaman high-speed line has been designed for a speed of 250 km/h.

Lines under construction and planning phase

Ankara–Sivas high-speed line

More than half of the budgeted investment has been done by 2014, and is planned to open in late-2021.

New travel time will be 2 hours and 51 minutes The new high-speed line will be double-tracked and have a length of  eastwards from Ankara to Sivas via Kırıkkale, Yerköy and Yozgat and constructed for the most part to the same  operational design as the previous lines. The infrastructure includes 6 viaducts (with a total length over ), 11 tunnels (including one of ~ in length), and 67 bridges. A 2019 update predicted service in 2022, 3 years behind schedule due to "geographic difficulties", but the project returned to the prior opening date of 2020 summer. In 2022, the Minister of Transport announced the opening of the line by the end of the year, as it is 99% complete in the spring.

The route study was completed by the end of 2006, and put up for tender in two parts; separated at the  mark from Ankara at Yerköy.

Sivas–Kars line
An extension eastwards to Kars from the Ankara – Sivas line is planned (a feasibility study done in 2006), passing through Erzincan and Erzurum. The line is expected to be built in three phases. It will be electrified and double-tracked based on the 250 km/h standard.

The design study for the Sivas–Erzincan section was completed by Italian-based SWS Engineering in July 2021. The project will include 59 bridges totaling , and 35 tunnels totaling  through a region with high seismicity and difficult hydrogeological conditions. The  section will start from the current station in Sivas, through Hafik, Zara, Imranli, Refahiye, and end in Erzincan.

Ankara-Kayseri 
A 142 km double-tracked electrified spur off of the Ankara-Sivas line, planned from Yerköy to Kayseri, construction began in July 2022, and is planned for completion by 2026, reducing travel times from Ankara to under 2 hours with a design speed of 250 km/h.

Osmaneli-Bursa-Bandırma 
The 201 km spur off the Istanbul-Ankara line from Osmaneli to Bandırma through Bursa is under construction and is slated for completion by 2023; the full line will be built for 200 km/h operation and cost 9.5 billion lira, bringing travel times between Ankara and Bursa to 2 hours and 10 minutes. The line is 78% complete as of April 2022.

Istanbul-Edirne 
A 229 km line on the European side of the Bosporus will connect Halkalı station in Istanbul with Kapıkule station in Edirne. Construction started in 2019 with an anticipated opening in 2023, and the project will reduce travel times from 4 hours to 1 hour 20 minutes. The double-tracked electrified railway will be built for 215 km/h operation and cost 10.5 billion lira, of which more than half is provided by a European Union grant.

Karaman-Ulukışla-Mersin-Gaziantep 
A further 135 km extension Ankara-Konya-Karaman line is currently in construction to Ulukışla, which is 89% complete as of winter 2022. Extensions from Ulukışla to Yenice and Aksaray are in the process of being tendered as of 2021, the 200 km/h line is planned to eventually reach Mersin and Adana. The Mersin-Adana-Osmaniye-Gaziantep high speed line is expected to open in 2024.

Ankara–İzmir high-speed line

The project has recently started, and was originally planned to be completed by the summer of 2020, then pushed back to 2022. However, this was delayed and now the first section between Poltalı and Afyonkarahisar will open in 2022, but the opening date of the rest of the line to Izmir is tentatively planned for 2024. The line is 52% complete as of April 2022.

The line will pass through Afyon to meet the high-speed line from Ankara to Istanbul near Polatlı. It will have a length of 624 km, with a projected running speed of 250 km/h The travel will take 3 hours and 30 minutes.

The construction of line is planned in three phases:

High-speed train sets and production facilities

TREVI ETR 500 test trains

The first high-speed trains to run on Turkish rails were two ETR 500 train sets rented from Trenitalia of Italy and were used for testing the completed part of the high-speed railway network, between Eskişehir and Ankara, on 23 April 2007. During the tests, ETR 500 Y2 achieved the current rail speed record in Turkey, reaching 303 km/h.

Siemens Velaro TR

The Velaro TR (TCDD HT80000) is a Velaro D derived 8-car standard gauge high-speed train for the Turkish State Railways (TCDD). The eight cars, totalling a length of 200 m, can accommodate 519 passengers and reach a top speed of 300 km/h. 25 kV 50 Hz AC power the train with a total of 8 MW.

Turkish State Railways (TCDD) placed an order for seven Velaro high-speed trainsets in July 2013. The contract is worth €285M, including seven years of maintenance. The Velaros are to be deployed on the Turkish high-speed railway network. The first Siemens Velaro TR entered service in 2014.

On 18 February 2015, TCDD ordered another 10 Velaro TR for delivery in 2017. The €400M contract include the first three years of maintenance and spareparts.

Unlike the traditional white – red – dark blue color scheme used on the TCDD HT65000 high-speed trains, a white – turquoise – grey color scheme has been selected for the livery of TCDD's Velaro TR trains.

EUROTEM

EUROTEM, alternatively Hyundai EURotem, is a joint enterprise between Hyundai Rotem of South Korea and TÜVASAŞ of Turkey which was established in 2006 and started production in December 2007. The Hyundai EURotem factory in Adapazarı, Turkey, was built as the Hızlı Tren Fabrikası (High-Speed Train Factory) with the purpose of manufacturing the next generation of Turkey's high-speed train sets.

See also
Turkish State Railways
Rail transport in Turkey
History of rail transport in Turkey
High-speed rail in Europe
High-speed rail

Notes and references

Notes

References

External links
 TCDD: Turkish State Railways
 RayHaber: Turkish railway news webpage and magazine
 Tren Saatleri (Turkish)

 
High-speed rail in Asia
High-speed rail in Europe